Frontal scale refers to the scales of a reptile which lie in the general region of the forehead of a snake, more specifically between the eyes and to the anterior of this area. These are analogous to the frontal bone on a human which corresponds to the forehead.

Snake scales attached to the frontals and to its anterior are called prefrontals.

See also
 Frontal bone
 Frontal shield
 Snake scales
 Anatomical terms of location

Snake scales